The 8th CARIFTA Games was held in Kingston, Jamaica on April 20–22, 1979.

Participation (unofficial)

Detailed result lists can be found on the "World Junior Athletics History" website.  An unofficial count yields the number of about 183 athletes (131 junior (under-20) and 52 youth (under-17)) from about 14 countries:  Antigua and Barbuda (1), Bahamas (36), Bermuda (23), British Virgin Islands (2), Cayman Islands (3), Grenada (3), Guadeloupe (4), Guyana (10), Jamaica (44), Lesser Antilles (1), Martinique (10), Saint Christopher-Nevis-Anguilla (2), Trinidad and Tobago (20).

Austin Sealy Award

The Austin Sealy Trophy was awarded to Jon
Jones from Jamaica.  He won 4 gold medals (100m, 200m, long jump, triple jump) in the youth (U-17) category, and therefore was described as the most outstanding athletes of the 39 stagings of the games.

Medal summary
Medal winners are published by category: Boys under 20 (Junior), Girls under 20 (Junior), Boys under 17 (Youth), and Girls under 17 (Youth).
Complete results can be found on the "World Junior Athletics History" website.

Boys under 20 (Junior)

Girls under 20 (Junior)

Boys under 17 (Youth)

Girls under 17 (Youth)

Medal table (unofficial)

References

External links
World Junior Athletics History

CARIFTA Games
1979 in Jamaican sport
CARIFTA
1979 in Caribbean sport
International sports competitions hosted by Jamaica